"Burn Slow" is a single by American rapper Wiz Khalifa. It was released on September 3, 2015. It was produced by Mike Will Made It and Marz. The song features a guest appearance from Swae Lee of American Southern hip hop duo Rae Sremmurd, although the whole group is credited for commercial reasons.

Commercial performance
"Burn Slow" debuted at number 83 on the Billboard Hot 100 chart for the week of September 26, 2015. Its debut was driven mostly by digital download sales, with 32,000 copies sold in its first week.

Chart performance

References

2015 singles
2015 songs
Wiz Khalifa songs
Rae Sremmurd songs
Rostrum Records singles
Songs written by Wiz Khalifa
Songs written by Swae Lee
Song recordings produced by Mike Will Made It
Songs written by Mike Will Made It
Swae Lee songs